Oduvil Unnikrishnan (13 February 1943 – 27 May 2006) was an Indian actor who worked in Malayalam cinema. He has portrayed supporting roles in both dramatic and comedic roles. He is a four-time winner of Kerala State Film Awards.

Early life
Oduvil Unnikrishnan was born on 13 February 1943 in Wadakkanchery, Thrissur, Kerala, India to Vadakkancheri Enkakkatt Oduvil Veettil Krishna Menon and Parukkutty Amma, as their youngest son. He had his primary education from Government Boys' High School, Wadakkanchery. His uncle Sarasakavi Oduvil Kunhikrishna Menon was a noted Malayalam writer. Unnikrishnan was interested in music since his childhood, and he learned vocal music and percussion instruments like mridangam and tabla. His trainer in vocal music was Kalamandalam Vasudeva Panikker. With his knowledge of music instruments, he joined some orchestra groups. He later joined renowned Malayalam theatres like K.P.A.C. and Kerala Kalavedi. His major job in those theatres was that of a tablist. He also sang many songs and composed songs for many albums, like 'Parasuram Express' an album named after the train through the places where it goes. He performed many fill-in roles in plays as well. That was his first experience in acting.

Film career
Oduvil Unnikrishnan debuted the film industry in the late 1970s with a role in Darshanam, directed by P. N. Menon. His second film was Chenda, directed by A. Vincent. His early notable roles were that of a mahout in Guruvayur Keshavan, directed by Bharathan and as Subbaiyer in Sarapanjaram, directed by Hariharan. He earned public recognition through character roles in films directed by Thoppil Bhasi, Hariharan and Sathyan Anthikkad. He has acted in more than 400 films. His memorable roles include those in Nizhalkuthu, Kathapurushan, Thooval Kottaram, Sargam, Yodha, Ponmuttayidunna Tharavu, Oru Cheru Punchiri, Aaram Thamburan and Manassinakkare. He could even make very brief roles like that of an idaykka player in Devasuram, directed by I. V. Sasi very memorable. He was regularly cast in films with Jayaram as the lead hero.

He composed music for an album named Parasuram Express (1984) to lyrics written by Bichu Thirumala and an unreleased film named Sarvam Saha directed by Ravi Gupthan. He won the Kerala State Film Award for Best Actor once and for Best Supporting Actor twice.

Personal life 
Unnikrishnan married Padmajam in 1975. They have two daughters, Padmini and Shalini.

Oduvil Unnikrishnan was suffering from kidney problems since 2000. He underwent dialysis at hospitals in Malappuram and Thrissur. Later, he was admitted to a private hospital in Kozhikode. He died there on 27 May 2006 at 6 am due to kidney failure. His body was taken to his birthplace at Wadakanchery, Thrissur and cremated at Ivarmadam, Pampady, nearby.

Awards

Kerala State Film Awards

Filmography

Ayirathil Oruvan (2009) - posthumously
Seetha Kalyanam (2009)- posthumously
Sanmanasullavan Appukuttan (2009)- Pisharadi Mashu (posthumously)
Magic Lamp (2008) - Achutha Menon (posthumously)
Rasathanthram (2006) as Ganeshan Chettiyar
Chandrolsavam (2005)
December (2005)
Choliyattam (2005)
Achuvinte Amma (2005) as Abdullah
Mayilattam (2004) as Kannan Mash
Runway (2004) as Krishnan Nair
Nizhalkoothu (2004)
Nerkku Nere (2004)
Vamanapuram Bus Route (2004) as Appukuttan
Maratha Nadu (2004) as Raman
Gaurisankaram (2003)
Manassinakkare (2003) as Sreedharan
Anyar (2003)
Pattalam (2003) as Narayanan
C.I.D. Moosa (2003) as Moolankuzhiyil Prabhakaran
Vellithira (2003) as Peppatty Nair
Gramaphone (2003) as Paattu Sett
Thilakkam (2003) as Govinda Panikkar
Choonda (2003) as Vasu
Yathrakarude Sradhakku (2002) as K. G. Nambiar
Nizhalkuthu (2002) as Kaliyappan the executioner
Kadha (2002)
Abharana Charthu (2002)
Meesha Madhavan (2002) as Achuthan Nampoothiri
Malayalimamanu Vanakkam (2002) as Narayana Kurup
Sundrapurushan (2001) as Suryanarayanan's Father
Narendran Makan Jayakanthan Vaka (2001) as 'Naxalite' Vasu
Ee Parakkum Thalika (2001) as Sreedhara Kaimal
Megasandesam (2001) as Easwara Varma
Rajapattam (2001)
Nalacharitham Nalam Divasam (2001)
Randam Bhavam (2001) as Easwaran Potty
Arayannegalude Veedu (2000) as Sreedharan
Darling Darling (2000)
Kochu Kochu Santhoshangal (2000) as Shekharan
Madhuranombarakattu (2000)
Oru Cheru Punchiri (2000)
Varnnakazhchakal (2000)
Chandamama (1999) as Bullet Achan
Deepasthambham Mahascharyam (1999) as Govinda Varma Raja
Njangal Santhushtaranu (1999) as Sanjeevan's Father
Pallavur Devanarayanan (1999) as Achuthan Marar
Udayapuram Sulthan (1999) as College Principal
Prem Poojari (1999)
Chandamamma (1999) as priest 
Veendum Chila Veettukaryangal (1999) as Fr. Nedumalam
Manthri Kumaran (1998)
Meenathil Thalikettu (1998) as Doctor 
Kattathoru Penpoovu (1998)
Kusruthikuruppu (1998) 
Mattupetti Machan (1998)
Sreekrishnapurathe Nakshathra Thilakkam (1998) as Munshi Parameshwara Pillai 
Meenakshi Kalyanam (1998) as Adv. K. T. Easwara Pillai
Vismayam (1998) as Adhikari
Kadhanayakan (1997) as Sankunni
Kaliyoonjal (1997)
Kudamattam (1997)
Aaram Thampuran (1997)
Kalyana Uniikal (1997) as Pushkaran Pillai
Manthramothiram (1997) as Fr. Vattakuzhi
Oral Mathram (1997) as K. P. Pankunny Menon
Ullasappoonkattu (1997) as Thirumeni 
Indra Prastham (1996)
The Prince (1996/II) as Ram Mohan
Udyanapalakan (1996)
Kadhapurushan (1996)
Dilliwala Rajakumaran (1996) as Rama Varma
Kalyana Sowgandhikam (1996) as Murukeshan
Sallapam (1996) as Madhava Menon
Thooval Kottaram (1996) as Achuthan Marar
Sathyabhaamaykkoru Pranayalekhanam (1996) as Warrier
Oru Abihibhashakante Case Diary (1995) as Ramavarma Thampuran
Aniyan Bava Chetan Bava (1995) as Easwara Pillai
Kusruthikaatu (1995) as Dr. K. Gopala Menon
Manikya Chempazhukka (1995)
Punnaram (1995)
Keerthanam (1995)
Minnaminuginum Minnukettu (1995) as Pothuval 
No 1 Snehatheeram Bangalore North (1995) as Shivaraman 
Sindoora Rekha (1995) as Raghavan Nair
Sipayi Lahala (1995) as Ratha's Father
Sreeragam (1995) as Indu's Father
Thirumanassu (1995) as Thirumulpad
Vishnu (1994) as Thampi
CID Unnikrishnan B.A., B.Ed. (1994)
Pingami (1994) as Menon
Vardakyapuranam (1994)
Bagyavan (1994)
Sagaram Sakshi (1994)
Parinayam (1994)
Sukrutham (1994)
Varanamaalyam (1994) as Sankara Pilla
Vadhu Doctoranu (1994) as Marar
Padheyam (1993) as Keezhseri Nampoothiri
Bandhukkal Sathrukkal (1993)
Kalippatam (1993)
Golanthara Vartha (1993)
Ente Sreekuttikku (1993)
Oru Kadamkadha Pole (1993) as Kaimal 
Meleparambil Aanveedu (1993) as Nair 
Bhagyavan (1993) as Vasudevan
Devasuram (1993) as Peringodu Sankara Marar
Sthalathe Pradhana Payyans (1993) as Poomukhathu Kurup
Sthreedhanam (1993)
Aayushkalam (1992) as Menon
Ellarum Chollanu (1992)
Kallanum Policem (1992)
Sheveliyar Michael (1992)
Yodha (1992)
Kamaladalam (1992)
Valayam (1992) as Govindan Ashan 
Kaazhchakkppuram (1992) as Appukuttan Nair
My Dear Muthachan (1992) as Factory Worker
Nakshthrakoodaram (1992) as Singapore Uncle
Oru Kochu Bhoomikulukkam (1992)
Pandu Pandoru Rajakumari (1992) as Parameswara Kaimal
Sargam (1992) as Valyachan
Snehasagaram (1992)
Kanalkkattu (1991) as Ayyappan Nair 
Aakasha Kottayile Sultan (1991) as Ramakrishna Iyer
Apoorvam Chilar (1991) as T. T. Punnoose
Cheppu Kilukkunna Changathi (1991) as Nishkalankan Pillai
Ennathe Programme (1991) as Unni's Father
Kadinjool Kalyanam (1991) as Pothuval
Kankettu (1991) as Ananthan
Mookkilyarajyathu (1991) as Doctor
Nettippattam (1991) as Avarachan
Bharatham (1991)
Dhanam (1991)
Ennum Nanmakal (1991)
Parallel College (1991) as Karunakaran
Sandesam (1991) as Achuthan Nair
Kuttettan (1990) as Nanu Nair
Kalikkalam (1990) as Devassy
Gajakesariyogam (1990) as Philipose
Kuruppinte Kanakku Pustakom (1990) as Gangadharan
Malayogam (1990) as 'Kaliyugam' Paramu Nair
Nagarangalil Chennu Raparkam (1990) as Panikkar
Sasneham (1990) as Srinivasa Iyer
Vidhyarambam (1990)
Pavam Pavam Rajakumaran (1990) as Principal 
Thalayanamanthram (1990) as K. G. Poduval
Ardham (1989) as Ananthan
Oru Vadakkan Veeragatha (1989) as Naduvazhi
Mazhavil Kavadi (1989) as Kunjappu
Peruvannapurathe Visheshangal (1989) as Appunni Nair
Pradeshika Varthakal (1989) as Priest
Season (1989) as Thirumeni
Ulsavapittennu (1989) as Paramu Nair
Nagaragalil Chennu Raparkkam (1989)Kireedam (1989)Kalpanan House (1989) as Fr. D'Souza
Vadakkunokkiyantram (1989) as Policeman
Varavelpu (1989) as Narayanan
Vicharana (1988) as Krishnamurthy
Dhwani (1988) as Kurpu
Kudumba Puranam (1988) as Achuthan
Pattana Pravesham (1988) as Home Minister
Ponn Muttyidunna Tharavu (1988)
Thaniyavarthanam (1987)
Kurukkan Rajavayi (1987)
Boomiyile Rajakkanmar (1987)
P.C. 369 (1987) as Adv. Swaminathan/Dr. Viswanathan/Prof. Kashinathan
Kandu Kandarinju (1985) as Hostel Warden
Boeing Boeing (1985)
Manykkale Thatha (1985) as Damodhara Kurup
Vellam (1985) as Moideen
Njaan Piranna Naattil (1985) as Menon
Appunni (1984) as Kurup Mash
Sreekrishna Prundu (1984)
Varanmaare Aavashyamundu (1983)
Anuraagakkodathi (1982) as Pachu Nair
Valarthu Mrugangal (1981) as Govindan
Poochasanyasi (1981)
Dwanthayudham (1981)
Sreeman Sreemathi (1981)
Randu Mukhangal (1981)
Veliyattam (1981) as Mani
Karimpana (1980) as Broker
Muthuchippikal (1980) as Keshavan
Lava (1980) as Panikkar
Vaika Vanna Vasantham (1980) as Gonsalvas
Sakthi (1980) as Man at the Toddy Shop
Mochanam (1979) 
Pushyaragam (1979) 
Sarapanjaram (1979) as Subbaiyer
Adimakkachavadam (1978) as Appan/Kudukudu Kuttappan
Guruvayoor Keshavan (1977)
Agni Nakshatram (1977)
Anugraham (1977) as School master Unnnikrishnan
Chakravakam (1974) as Mammad
Chenda (1973) as Mahout
Dharmayudham (1973) as Avarachan
Darshanam (1973)

As a composer
 Parasuram Express (1984 album): lyrics by Bichu Thirumala; singers K. P. Brahmanandan, K. S. Chitra, Krishnachandran, Lathika.
 Sarvam Saha'' (unreleased movie) directed by Ravi Gupthan.
Malayalam Basic Devotional SREE PADAM {1984 ALBUM}: lyrics by Bharanikkavu sivakumar: singers P. Jayachandran, Dhanya, Sunanda

HMV LP RECORD SIDE 1 [S2XJT. 10651]
SONGS:
1, VIGHNESHWARA SIVANANDANA
2, VRISCHIKA KRISHNASHTAMI
3, MANINAGANGALE
4, MOOKAMBIKE
5, ASHTAKSHARAMANTHRADHWANI

HMV LP RECORD SIDE 2 [S2XJT. 10652]
SONGS:
1, GOKULASHTAMI
2, PAVIZHAMALARUKAL
3, OCHIRAVAZHUM
4, DEVIKANYAKUMARI
5, VADAKKANTHARAKAVILULSAVAM

References

External links

Oduvil Unnikrishnan at MSI
Biographical profile

1944 births
2006 deaths
Deaths from kidney failure
Indian male film actors
Kerala State Film Award winners
Male actors in Malayalam cinema
Male actors from Thrissur
Malayalam film score composers
Musicians from Thrissur
20th-century Indian composers
20th-century Indian male actors
21st-century Indian male actors